"The Proposal Proposal" is the first episode of the eleventh season, and 232nd episode overall of The Big Bang Theory. It first aired on CBS on September 25, 2017.

Plot 
Amy enthusiastically accepts Sheldon's marriage proposal. However, when dining with Amy's colleagues later that night, Sheldon is offended that they are more impressed with Amy's work than his own. With help from Stephen Hawking, Sheldon later comes to grips with the fact that he will not always be the center of attention in the marriage. Bernadette is shocked to realize that she is pregnant again. She and Howard are not thrilled at the idea of having another baby so soon after their first. They attempt to convince Leonard and Penny to have a child as well but are rebuffed.

Reception

Ratings 
The episode was watched live by 17.65 million viewers, and had a ratings share of 4.1/16, during its original broadcast.

The episode attracted 2,182,000 viewers upon its British premiere, making it the most watched programme on E4 for the week.

Critical response 
Jesse Schedeen of IGN rated the episode 5.9, complimenting how the episode "handled Sheldon's proposal" but criticized how the show has become stale after its ten-year run.

Caroline Preece of Den of Geek criticized how tired Sheldon not understanding his own arrogance and narcissism is.

References

External links 

 "The Proposal Proposal" at CBS.com
 

2017 American television episodes
The Big Bang Theory episodes